Digenes Akritas is the most famous of the Acritic songs and is often regarded as the only surviving epic poem from the Byzantine Empire. The epic details the life of the hero, Basil (Βασίλειος), whose epithet Digenes Akritas ("two-blood border lord" ) refers to his mixed Roman (Greek) and Arab descent. The first part of the epic details the lives of his parents, how they met, and how his father, an emir, converted to Christianity after abducting and marrying Digenes' mother. The remainder of the epic discusses, often from a first-person point of view, Basil's acts of heroism on the Byzantine borders. Inspiration for the epic may derive from historical Cappadocian general and emperor Romanos Diogenes.

Manuscripts and versions 
The Digenes Akrites is an extensive narrative text, although it is not in a pure epic-heroic style. No fewer than six manuscripts have been found dedicated to stories about him. The oldest two are El Escorial (or E, 1867 lines) and Grottaferrata versions (or G, 3749 lines), from the names of the libraries in which the respective manuscripts are held. While the form (or forms) in which it has survived is not the product of oral composition, it has nevertheless retained a considerable number of features of its oral origins. The common core of the two versions preserved in the E and G manuscripts goes back to the twelfth century. The text of E appears to be closer to the original composition while G represents a version that is heavily marked by learned reworking. Both texts give enchanting descriptions of the life of the martial societies of the border regions of the empire, while in the figure of Digenes are concentrated the legends that had accumulated around local heroes. El Escorial version is the superior of the two in respect of the power and immediacy of the battle scenes and austerity of style. The epic descriptions of the mounted knights and battles are marked by drama, a swift pace and lively visual detail.

There exists an Old Slavonic version of Digenis Akritas under the title Deeds of the Brave Men of Old (Дѣяніе прежнихъ временъ храбрыхъ человѣкъ), which is adapted from a line in the Grottaferrata manuscript. The Slavonic version is often called the Devgenievo deianie, but this title is not found in manuscripts. It contains both straightforward translation and free retelling of the Greek version in the Grottaferrata manuscript. It was produced in a bilingual Greek–South Slavic milieu, probably in Macedonia under the Serbian Empire (14th century) or its successors. It has features suggestive of oral-formulaic composition.

Storyline 

The Arab–Byzantine wars that lasted from the seventh century to the early 11th century provide the context for Byzantine heroic poetry written in Medieval Greek. The Akritai of the Byzantine Empire of this period were a military class responsible for safeguarding the frontier regions of the imperial territory from external enemies and freebooting adventurers who operated on the fringes of the empire. The work comprises two parts.

In the first, the "Lay of the Emir", which bears more obviously the characteristics of epic poetry, an Arab amir invades Cappadocia and carries off the daughter of a Byzantine general. The emir agrees to convert to Christianity for the sake of the daughter and resettles in the Byzantine Empire ( Romanía, the lands of the Ρωμηοί Romioi) together with his people. The issue of their union is a son, Digenes Akritas.

The second part of the work relates the development of the young hero and his superhuman feats of bravery and strength. As a boy, he goes hunting with his father and kills two bears unarmed, strangling the first to death and breaking the second one's spine. He also tears a hind in half with his bare hands, and slays a lion in the same manner. Like his father, he carries off the daughter of another Byzantine general and then marries her; he kills a dragon; he takes on the so-called apelátai, a group of bandits, and then defeats their three leaders in single combat. No one, not even the amazingly strong female warrior Maximu, with whom he commits the sin of adultery, can match him. Having defeated all his enemies Digenes builds a luxurious palace by the Euphrates, where he ends his days peacefully. Cypriot legend has it that he grabbed hold of the Pentadaktylos ("Five Fingers") mountain range north of Nicosia in order to leap to Anatolia. The mountain range, as the name suggests, resembles five knuckles sprouting from the ground.

The tale of Digenes continued to be read and enjoyed in later centuries, as the text survives in various versions dating to as late as the 17th century. The epic tale of Digenes Akritas corresponds in many ways to a cycle of much shorter Acritic songs, particularly from Anatolia, Cyprus and Crete, some of which survive until the present day. In the later tradition Digenes is eventually defeated only by Death, in the figure of Thanatos/Charon, after fierce single combat on "the marble threshing floors". Thanatos had reportedly already wrestled with Heracles. The Greek-Canadian composer Christos Hatzis has used this text as the basis for a portion of his "Constantinople". 

The story of Digenes Akritas, defeated by Death personally, was used as a basis of a Russian bylina (a folk ballad) about Anika the Warrior.

Form 
The Digenes Akritas is written in Early Demotic Greek and is composed in fifteen syllable blank verse. Rhyming occurs rarely. 

The poem does not diverge from the standard political verse of popular Byzantine literature. Each line holds its own and every hemistich is carefully balanced. The poem flows, is cadential, with no cacophonies with very scarce sound repetitions.

Below is an excerpt from the translation of the Escorial manuscript, lines 32-55, by E. M. Jeffreys (pp. 240–3):

See also 
 Delhemma, the Arab counterpart
 Battal Gazi, the Turkish counterpart
 Prince Marko, a Serbian equivalent
 Beowulf, Anglo-Saxon equivalent
 Igor, Russian equivalent
 Sigurd, German-Norse equivalent
 El Cid, Spanish equivalent

Notes

References

Sources
 
Mavrogordato, John. Digenes Akrites. Oxford, 1956. The Grottaferrata version with parallel English translation.
Beaton, Roderick and David Ricks (edd.). Digenes Akrites: New Approaches to Byzantine Heroic Poetry. Aldershot: King's College London, 1993. . Articles by Magdalino, Alexiou, Jeffreys, Mackridge and others.
Beaton, Roderick. The Medieval Greek Romance. London: CUP, 1996.  (hardback), 0415120330 (paperback). Much improved 2nd ed. Good discussion of the Digenes Acrites.
Jeffreys, Elizabeth. Digenis Akritis. Cambridge: CUP, 1998.  (hardback). Escorial & Grottaferrata versions with parallel English translation.
Bartikyan, Hrach. "Armenia and Armenians in the Byzantine Epic," in Digenes Akrites: New Approaches to Byzantine Heroic Poetry (Centre for Hellenic Studies, Kings College London). David Ricks (ed.) Brookfield, Vt.: Variorum, 1993 .

Further reading
Vasilief, A History of the Byzantine Empire - The Macedonian epoch (867-1081) Includes an extensive discussion of the Digenis Acrites
Hesseling, D. C. Le roman de Digenis Akritas d'après le manuscrit de Madrid, 1911–1912, 537pp.
 Bartikyan, Hrach. "Замeтки o Византийскoм эпoce o Дигeнce Aкpитe." Византийский временник, т. 25, 1964.
Legrand, Émilie. Recueil de chansons populaires Grecques, Paris, 1904, 23pp.

Epic poems in Greek
Greek literature
Acritic songs